The Archdeacon of the Isles (or Sodor) was the only archdeacon in the diocese of the Isles, acting as a subordinate of the Bishop of the Isles. The number and names of the prebends, if any, associated with the archdeaconry in the later Middle Ages are not known. Before the break-away of the diocese of Man during the Western Schism, the archdeacons held Kirk Andreas as a prebend. The office seems to have fallen into disuse after the time of Alasdair Caimbeul, who received crown presentation to the position in 1592. It was to be revived in 1662.

List of archdeacons of Man
 Diarmait (Dermicius), fl. 1180x1190–1217x1219
 Lawrence, x1246–1248
 Domhnall (Dompnald), fl. 1253 x 1265
 Makaboy (Mac Fhiodhbhuidhe?), fl. 1270
 A [_], fl. 1302
 Cormac, fl. 1320
 John Dempster, fl. 1349
 Nigel Mauricii, died 1372

List of archdeacons of the Isles
 Beoan [mac Eoin] Mac Cholgain (Bean Johannis Macuilquen), 1372–1390/97
 Niall Mac Iomhair, 1390–1408
 Crisdean Mac Domhnaill Elich, fl. 1408
 Gille-Brighde Mac Dughaill, died x 1416
 John de Carrick (Eoin a Charraig), provided 1416
 Eachann MacGill-Eain, 1416–1441
 Andrew of Dunoon, 1441–1456x1457
 Niall Mac Cormaig, provided 1455 
 Aonghas of the Isles, provided 1456 
 Gilbert Smerles, 1457–1460 
 James Borthwick, provided 1457 
 Donnchadh [_], fl. 1462 
 Crisdean mac Gille-Brighde (Bricii), fl. 1463–1469 
 Gilbert Wright, fl. 1472  
 Niall mac Gille-Brighde (MacIlvride, MacYlwryd, Makkikbreid), fl. 1476–1479 
 Thomas Clerk (Tomas Cleireach), fl. 1500
 Thomas Fleming, died 1516 
 Richard Lawson, 1516–1541x1544 
 Ruairidh MacGill-Eain (Roderick MacLean), fl. 1544–1548 
 Gill-Easbaig Mac an Rothaich (Archibald Munro), fl. 1548 
 Domhnall Mac an Rothaich (Donald Munro), fl 1553–1563x1584 
 Domhnall Carsuel (Donald Carswell), died 1592 
 Alasdair Caimbeul (Alexander Campbell), fl. 1592

See also

Notes

References

 
 

History of Argyll and Bute
History of the Outer Hebrides
Isles
Religion in Argyll and Bute
Religion in Highland (council area)
Religion in the Outer Hebrides